Uncanny Avengers is a comic book series first appearing in the October 2012 debut of Marvel NOW!, published by Marvel Comics. The series follows an interconnected fictional superhero team, featuring members from the Marvel Universe (specifically the Avengers and X-Men). The team is united by Captain America upon the conclusion of Avengers vs. X-Men. Uncanny Avengers is also known as Avengers Unity Squad.

Publication history

Marvel Comics announced Uncanny Avengers by the creative team of Rick Remender and John Cassaday in August 2012. Uncanny Avengers follows a new team of Avengers formed in response to the events of Avengers vs. X-Men. The team features a line-up of both classic Avengers and X-Men including Captain America (Steve Rogers), Havok, Rogue, the Scarlet Witch, Thor, and Wolverine.

Remender said, "There's something that Cyclops said to [Captain America] on Utopia that's ringing in his head. He didn't do enough to help. And Steve (Captain America) is taking that to heart. Coming out of AvX with the landscape shifted and changed as much as it is, there are events that lead Steve to recognizing that he needs to do more".

In October 2014, the second volume of Uncanny Avengers was announced to start in January 2015 with art by Daniel Acuña and written by Rick Remender. This volume ended due to cancellation after Issue #5 in May 2015. The roster for the second volume included Captain America (Sam Wilson), Scarlet Witch, Rogue, Quicksilver, Vision, Sabretooth, and Doctor Voodoo.

The third volume began in October 2015, and was written by Gerry Duggan with art by Ryan Stegman.. It ended with Issue 30, which was released in December 2017.

Fictional team history

Volume 1

The Red Shadow
Wolverine gives a eulogy at the funeral of Professor X, which is held at the Jean Grey School, while Havok visits Cyclops in prison to discuss Cyclops' actions as the Phoenix. Afterward, Captain America and Thor meet with Havok, where Captain America offers him the chance to lead a new Avengers team. They are attacked by a lobotomized Avalanche and unite to defeat him while saving as many civilians as possible. While paying her respects to Professor X at his grave, Scarlet Witch is confronted by Rogue about her role in everything that has happened to the X-Men and the mutant race. While arguing, they are attacked by Red Skull's S-Men, who defeat them both and steal Professor X's body. In his lair, the Red Skull is seen removing Professor X's brain as part of his plan to gain the power to "eradicate the mutant menace".

While looking for survivors after Avalanche's attack, Wolverine questions Captain America's choice of having Havok lead the team and Thor vows to resolve the mutant conflict. Meanwhile, through a televised appearance of "Honest John, the Living Propaganda", Red Skull is able to make certain people kill their mutated friends. In addition to this, Rogue escapes after being captured by the S-Men and Scarlet Witch is tempted by Red Skull to repeat the events of House of M. Rogue attacks the Scarlet Witch and they fight until they both discover the lobotomized body of Professor X. Red Skull arrives and reveals that he has fused his brain with Professor X's brain. Red Skull also reveals that he is a clone of the original Red Skull that was created in 1942 and held in cryogenic stasis in the event that Germany lost World War II.

Using Professor X's telepathy, Red Skull provokes ordinary citizens of New York into joining the S-Men in a mass assault against potential mutants and force Scarlet Witch and Rogue to allow themselves to be attacked, even managing to take control of Thor after Red Skull has Honest John take the form of Odin to manipulate him. When fighting Wolverine, Red Skull has Goat-Faced Girl negate Wolverine's healing factor so that Thor can land a cataclysmic blow on Wolverine. However, Red Skull is unable to completely control Captain America, and an attack against him disrupts his powers long enough for Rogue and Scarlet Witch to break free.

As the Scarlet Witch fights the mind-controlled Thor, Red Skull tries tempting Captain America into joining his anti-mutant crusade again. With some help from Havok, Scarlet Witch removes Thor from the battle allowing Havok and Rogue to aid Captain America against the Red Skull overpowering him until Dancing Water saves him. With the people around them free, Havok informs them the attacks on the mutants wasn't their fault. Back at the Avengers Mansion (the base for the newly coined "Avengers Unity Squad"), Captain America and Havok look at leads to find the S-Men and Havok expresses doubts over his own leadership. The Scarlet Witch attempts to befriend Rogue, who refuses, stating she is joining the team to honour Xavier and keep an eye on Wanda. Thor tells Wolverine that he hasn't failed Professor X's dream.

The team makes their debut as the Avengers Unity Squad (which also contains Sunfire, Wasp, and Wonder Man as the team's latest recruits) during a press conference which was then crashed by a resurrected Grim Reaper, who attacks the Avengers Unity Squad while claiming that he is now unable to die. During the fight, Rogue absorbs some of Wonder Man's powers and seemingly punches Grim Reaper harder than normal which apparently kills him.

Apocalypse Twins
In 1013 AD at a Scandinavian inn, Thor is in a bar fight when he is attacked by Apocalypse, who acts to safeguard the future due to information given him by Rama-Tut. Thor finds that Apocalypse is wearing Celestial-built armor that can withstand the powers of a god. Thor returns to Asgard and demands an audience with his father Odin, but when Odin asks him to take the high road, Thor turns to Loki for help. Loki leads him to a hidden scroll in Odin's library which could bless a weapon to pierce Celestial armor, only for "Loki" to later be revealed as Kang the Conqueror. Thor returns to London and slays the 11th Century Apocalypse's version of the Horsemen of Apocalypse. He then breaks into Apocalypse's craft and manages to cut his armor open with his axe Jarnbjorn, but Apocalypse escapes. Odin warns that one day this act will cause great calamity. In the present day, Kang appears at the final resting place of Baron Mordo in Brazil, and takes Jarnbjorn.

Havok clears Rogue's name with S.H.I.E.L.D for killing Grim Reaper and has her start an investigation into Magneto. While Wasp shows Havok her clothing line to promote mutants, a Celestial ship controlled by the Apocalypse Twins crashes into S.W.O.R.D.'s Peak base with Captain America and Sunfire aboard in response to the Twins killing of a Celestial using Jarnbjorn. Sunfire lets Captain America escape while Thor flies towards the wreckage. Thor breaks pieces of the falling wreckage, and with the help of Sunfire, prevents casualties. Thor and Sunfire travel throughout space to the Apocalypse Twins ship, and are teleported away upon entering. Meanwhile, the remaining members of the team, travel in the Quinbird, on a search for the twins. In South Sudan, Captain America exits his pod and is attacked by local soldiers. He travels to a demolished church for shelter and finds a message with his name on it there from Immortus. In Akkaba metropolis, Thor and Sunfire learn how their manipulation long ago was in the Twins favor. The twins then cause an explosion seemingly killing all de-powered mutants, who lost their powers long ago at the hands of the Scarlet Witch, and the Avengers Unity Squad.

The team eventually learns of Logan's murder of Daken and or Thor's impetuous behavior in creating the celestially powered Jarnbjorn. The team splits up, which is what the Twins wanted, just before introducing the new four horsemen of Apocalypse: Grim reaper, Banshee, Daken, and Sentry. Banshee subdues Havok and kidnaps Scarlet Witch, Reaper kidnaps his brother, Wonder Man, and Sentry subdues Thor, while Daken imprisons Wolverine. The Twins convince Scarlet Witch that only she can save the mutant race from extinction, by creating a hex spell large enough to teleport them to their own universe, and allow Earth to be taken over by Red Skull/Onslaught.

Ragnarok Now

The divided Avengers Unity Squad must reunite to stop the Apocalypse Twins. Scarlet Witch convinces Wonder Man to act as a power cell to cast a spell to bring all the mutants on Earth to an Ark, but she planned to double-cross the twins. Unbeknownst to Rogue, she decides the only way to stop Wanda is by eliminating her, so she steals Logan's claw power and stabs her. Grim Reaper then stabs Rogue in the back. Right before Wanda dies Wonder Man sacrifices himself to channel Wanda's final spell, a treachery foreseen by Eimin, who entraps the entire mutant population. Exiter, the celestial executioner, comes to destroy Earth. Stark and all Earth's heroes feebly try to stop the advance. Thor and Captain America divide the twins, but Rogers is killed by Reaper and Exiter destroys Earth. Thor returns to Asgard and Odin chastises him that it was Thor's fault for creating Jarnborjn and mankind was doomed.

Avenge the Earth
The story starts in an alternate future where all the world's mutants are living on Planet X following the destruction of Earth by the Celestials. While most of the mutant population has accepted the new status quo—believing that the Scarlet Witch died willingly to save them, while the Avengers tried to stop the inevitable—the remaining free Avengers (Havok, Thor and Wasp, aided by Beast) must work with Kang and his Chrono-Corp to defeat Eimen. Having rescued Wolverine and Sunfire from being tortured on the Apocalypse Ark, the Avengers use Kang's technology to project their minds back into their past selves and stop the Celestials before they can strike.

The timeline is successfully altered by the Avengers, when Rogue, empowered by numerous heroes, and Sentry slow Exitar's descent long enough for Thor to slay Exitar using Jarnbjorn, preventing the Earth's destruction. Despite Kang's attempt to steal the power of the Celestial for himself, the tables are turned when Havok and Sunfire steal the Celestial's cosmic power and use it against Kang. Kang retreats as Immortus appears with his Chrono-Corps, but Sunfire is converted to an energy-based form when his body is destroyed, Simon's essence is trapped within Rogue, Havok is left badly burned, and Havok and Wasp are left devastated by the apparent loss of their daughter (conceived in the future and taken by Kang to protect her from the change in the timeline).

Uncanny Avengers Annual
A one-issue story following the introduction of the Avengers of the Supernatural, including Doctor Strange, Ghost Rider, Man-Thing, Blade, Satana and Manphibian. The Avengers of the Supernatural are chosen by Mojo for his newest reality show. Under mind-control, they abduct the Avengers Unity Squad from the Avengers Mansion, and once in Mojoworld, both teams are made to take part in a reality show called "Martian Transylvania Super Hero Mutant Monster Hunter High School". In the show, the mutants of the Unity Squad are goth outcasts, the rest are football stars and cheerleaders, and the Avengers of the Supernatural are the geeks of the High School. As part of the show, the Scarlet Witch tells Johnny Blaze she is pregnant, but the Spirit of Vengeance believes it really has an offspring. As Blaze is possessed by the spirit, he goes "too far out of character", and Mojo's influence over the other heroes is broken. Ghost Rider then starts rampaging through Mojoworld looking for sinner souls to punish, until Mojo convinces The Avengers to save Mojoworld, as there were numerous innocent lives. Both Avengers teams fight Ghost Rider in order to distract him, and let Satana pry the Spirit of Vengeance from Blaze and temper it. Satana fails, but Rogue manages to sneak up on Ghost Rider and absorb his powers. She becomes the new Ghost Rider and tempers the Spirit of Vengeance, but as it begins taking control of her, Blaze reabsorbs the spirit into him, becoming the Ghost Rider once more. Having controlled the Spirit of Vengeance and saved Mojoworld, the Avengers of the Supernatural and the Unity Squad return to their universes.

AXIS
During the AXIS storyline, Red Skull's S-Men abduct Havok, Rogue, and Scarlet Witch. They manage to break free thanks to Rogue's new powers from Wonder Man where they manage to rescue Magneto. When the group is confronted by the S-Men, Magneto uses his abilities to kill the S-Men and then kill Red Skull which causes him to unleash the Red Onslaught. Magneto, Havok, Rogue, and Scarlet Witch confront Red Onslaught and are joined by the Avengers, the X-Men, and the allies of both teams. Red Onslaught then unleashes the Stark Sentinels on them. After Scarlet Witch and Doctor Doom cast an inversion spell, Red Onslaught is inverted alongside the personalities of those present. When it came to deciding on what should be done about Red Skull, Havok quits the Avengers Unity Squad and rejoins the X-Men. Following the reinversion spell being cast, the Avengers Unity Squad is rebuilt with a revived Doctor Voodoo as its latest member.

Volume 2

Trip to Counter-Earth
The Avengers Unity Squad are joined by a reformed Sabretooth when they head to the High Evolutionary's Counter Earth to look for Scarlet Witch and Quicksilver. The members of the Unity Squad were scattered across Counter-Earth. Captain America is trapped and assimilated by tree-like creatures, Vision found himself in a technological city where he met an android named Eve, Rogue is found and experimented on by the Master Scientist, who expunged Wonder Man from her, Doctor Voodoo appeared in a destroyed city inhabited by the souls of those killed in the High Evolutionary's search for genetic perfection, and Sabretooth appeared in one of the Counter-Earth's main cities where he is quickly taken down by the New Men, and later forced to obey the High Evolutionary. Quicksilver and Scarlet Witch were abducted by the Low Evolutionary and brought to Lowtown, where the rejected experiments of the High Evolutionary resided. Quicksilver and Scarlet Witch agree to help the Low Evolutionary take down the High Evolutionary, when they are attacked by the High Evolutionary's creation Luminous, who sports the abilities of Quicksilver and Scarlet Witch.

After escaping the High Evolutionary's experiments and learning their true origins, Quicksilver and Scarlet Witch found Rogue and joined the fight to defend Lowtown from the High Evolutionary. During the battle, Sabretooth broke free from the High Evolutionary's control. Captain America also appeared on the scene, where he had overcome his transformation after the tree-like creatures had been summoned to battle, and fought for Lowtown. Vision saved Scarlet Witch from Luminous, while Doctor Voodoo heavily damaged the High Evolutionary. Quicksilver delivered the final blow to the High Evolutionary, who fled Counter-Earth with Luminous.

Volume 3

Lost Future

As part of the All-New, All-Different Marvel, the Avengers Unity Squad are now helping humankind, mutants, and Inhumans. Rogue remains on the team to represent the mutants while Human Torch and a new telepath named Synapse represent the Inhumans. While Quicksilver and Doctor Voodoo remained on the team, Scarlet Witch, Vision, and Sabretooth did not rejoin the group. While Spider-Man leaves the team, Commander Steve Rogers convinces Deadpool to remain on the team as he did help to save Rogue's life.

When Super-Adaptoid returns to Earth, it fought the Avengers Unity Squad. While it is able to copy Human Torch's powers on a whim like before, Deadpool touched it barehanded. Not only did Super-Adaptoid copy Deadpool's powers, it also copied Deadpool's cancer as it became overrun with the disease that killed the organic properties of Super-Adaptoid. Deadpool is scolded for his reckless abandon which led to Spider-Man quitting the Avengers Unity Squad.

The Avengers also travel to Weirdworld to arrest Black Knight after almost killing Savage Steel and murdering Carnivore. Steve Rogers almost succumbs to the insanity of the Ebony Blade, before leaving it with Dane Whitman in Weirdworld.

During the Avengers: Standoff! storyline, the Avengers Unity Squad arrive in Connecticut upon answering Commander Steve Rogers' call. They discover Wrecker trying to escape in an SUV with Maria Hill. The Avengers Unity Squad help Wrecker and Maria Hill avoid the S.H.I.E.L.D. forces. While on their way to Pleasant Hill, the Avengers Unity Squad is attacked by another Maria Hill who is on a Quinjet with the Avengers.

The Man Who Fell to Earth 
Hank Pym returns to Earth and joins the Unity Squad after talking to Steve. However, Steve doesn't trust him and calls in the Wasp for help. Hank Pym is revealed to be dead, killed by Ultron and taken on Hank's appearance and memories. The Unity Squad attempt to stop Ultron with the help of the Vision. Ultron/Hank is defeated when Vision teleports him into space.

Civil War II
Faced with the tension of the escalating conflict in the superhuman community, along with Steve's own refusal to deal with the threat of the Terrigenesis cloud and the danger to mutant lives, Rogue contemplates disbanding the Unity Squad, but they are called back together when Doctor Voodoo reveals that his brother has allied with the Hand to steal Bruce Banner's corpse and resurrect the Hulk as their soldier. The Squad is unable to stop the Hand's ceremony, but after they contain the Hulk, Voodoo is able to enter the astral plane and release Banner of the Hand's influence, choosing his friend Bruce over the Hand's offer to release his brother's spirit.

As the war ends, the Red Skull mounts his attack, having used his telepathic powers to subtly take control of the heroes, but Deadpool is able to resist him long enough to place Magneto's old helmet on Rogue, allowing her to defeat the Skull. Beast subsequently performs an operation to remove the elements of Xavier's brain from the Skull without compromising the Skull's personality, Rogue and Johnny incinerating the brain fragment to prevent anyone else using Xavier in that manner.

Other Version

Age of Ultron
In an alternate reality, the Earth is near the end due to Ultron nearly destroying the world. Wolverine tries to fix the world by using time travel to kill Hank Pym before he invented Ultron. By doing so, the world is altered. This issue features the Apocalypse Twins trying to kill Colonel America (an alternate version of Captain America) while under the orders of Kang the Conqueror. While Colonel America goes into the sewers to meet Havok, he is attacked by the twins. Colonel America manages to escape injured but is unable to prevent the deaths of the alternate versions of Havok and Rogue. After the twins fail their task, Kang plans to send the Twins back to the mutant camps for the next few years.

Roster

Reception

 Comic Book Resources gave Uncanny Avengers #1 a 4.5/5, declaring it to be a "grand opening to Marvel NOW!".
 IGN gave Uncanny Avengers #1 a 7.9 "Good" rating.

Collected editions

References

External links
 Marvel Now – Marvel Comics 
 Avengers Unity Division at Marvel Wiki

Avengers (comics) titles
2012 comics debuts